Madeley is a town and a civil parish in the district of Telford and Wrekin, Shropshire, England.  It contains 54 listed buildings that are recorded in the National Heritage List for England.  Of these, one is listed at Grade I, the highest of the three grades, seven are at Grade II*, the middle grade, and the others are at Grade II, the lowest grade.  Most of the listed buildings are grouped in or near the town centre, and these include houses and cottages, the earliest being timber framed, two larger houses with associated structures, churches, a presbytery, a school, and a war memorial.  To the north of the town centre is Madeley Court, now a hotel, which is listed together with associated structures.  Outside the town centre are more listed houses, two public houses, and former industrial structures, including an inclined plane, a bridge, and the remains of a brickworks and an ironworks, the latter two forming part of the museum at Blists Hill Victorian Town.


Key

Buildings

References

Citations

Sources

Lists of buildings and structures in Shropshire